Kennedy Odhiambo is a Kenyan former international footballer who played as a defender.

Career
Odhiambo played club football for Oserian Fastac, Chemelil Sugar and World Hope.

He earned nine international caps for Kenya between 2000 and 2001.

References

Year of birth missing (living people)
Living people
Kenyan footballers
Kenya international footballers
Oserian F.C. players
Chemelil Sugar F.C. players
Nairobi City Stars players
Kenyan Premier League players
Association football defenders